Muak (무악(巫樂)), or Musok Eumak (무속 음악(巫俗音樂)), is the traditional Korean shamanistic music performed at and during a shamanistic ritual, the Gut. It consists of singing, dancing and percussion music. 

The traditional Korean shaman ritual, the Gut, is always in harmony with singing, dancing and performing music. It is not performed solely for spiritual rites, but also allows experiencing the archetype of traditional Korean music.

Overview 
The Shaman priests, acting as intercessors between the spiritual world and human beings, inherit the right to perform the shaman rituals through bloodline. They study the rites and traditions from their parents by attending the rituals since their childhood. The important elements of the ritual, as well as technical and artistic skills, are handed down from generation to generation and have not been altered. Traditionally, the Gut shaman ritual has been performed by a priest, however today it is hardly performed for spiritual purposes anymore, but instead as a cultural asset of the arts on stage.

The rhythmic patterns of Muak have changed little in the last 500 years and remain close to their original ancestral form. Blending this with various improvisations of rhythm allows audiences an insight into mystic contemporary music in Korea. Today, there are still famous shaman priests in Korea who evoke our human creative instinct with their performances.

Muak group 

The modern Muak ensemble has 4 performers, who belong to the Donghaean Byeolsin Gut troupe, and represent a Gut (shaman ritual) from the eastern coast (Donghaean) region of Korea.

The current musical director, Kim Yong-taek, holds the title of an important intangible cultural asset for the Donghaean Byeolsin Gut. Another prominent member is Kim Jeong-Hee who is a percussionist in Korea. The ensemble is completed by two performers of the younger generation: Jo Jung-Hun and Park Beom-Tae.

The performers and their instruments: 
Kim Yong-taek (Director) - Janggu, Vocal   
Kim Jeong-hee (Assistant Director) - 1st Kkwaenggwari Vocal 
Jo Jong-hun - 2nd Kkwaenggwari 
Park Beom-tae – Jing & Taepyeongso

See also 

 Samul nori, a genre of percussion music that originated in Korea.

References

Korean traditional music
Muism